Brian Free & Assurance is a Southern Gospel group. Brian Free formed the group in 1993 after performing with the Gold City Quartet from 1982-1994. Since being formed, the group has released multiple albums.

Band members
 Brian Free - Tenor 
 Bill Shivers - Lead
 Jake Anglin - Baritone

Past members

Lead
 Kevin Price (1993-1995)
 Kevin McCaw (1995-1997)
 Randy Crawford (1997-1998; 2009-2010)

Baritone
 Mike LeFevre (1993-1997)
 John McBroom (1997-1998)
 Craig Singletary (2001-2003)
 Derrick Selph (2003-2009; 2010-2013)
 Randy Crawford (2009-2010)
 Mike Rogers (2013-2021)

Bass
 Bob Caldwell (1996-1998)
 Bill Lawrence (2001-2003)
 Keith Plott (2003-2007)
 Jeremy Lile (2008-2015)

Pianist
 Michael Camp (2001-2002)
 Josh Simpson (2002-2003)
 Scott McDowell (2003-2008)

Drummer
 Ricky Free (1998-2007)

Discography

Brian Free & Assurance (1994)
Requests (1994)
Things That Last Forever (1995)
Live In Atlanta (1995)
At Your Request (1996)
4 God So Loved (1996)
A Glimpse Of Gold (1997)
Doing This For You (1999)
Lovin' This Livin' For The Lord (2001)
So Close To Home (2002)
Timeless Hymns & Classics (2002)
Greater Still (2003)
Live In New York City (2005)
Christmas With Brian Free And Assurance (2005)
It's So God (2006)
Real Faith (2007)
Timeless Hymns & Classics Volume II (2008)
Worth It (2009)
7 Hits (2009)
Acappella (2010)
Never Walk Alone (2010)
A Season To Remember (2011)
Nothing But Love (2012)
Unashamed (2014)
Live Like We're Redeemed (2016)
Live At Daywind Studios (2016)
Signature Ballads (2017)
Beyond Amazed (2017)
How Good Does Grace Feel (2019)
Looks Like Jesus (2021)
Meet Me At The Cross (2022)

Awards

External links
Official Website
Twitter
Facebook
YouTube
Android App
iPhone App

Southern gospel performers
Christian musical groups
Musical groups established in 1993
1993 establishments in the United States